"Déjala Que Vuelva" is a song by Colombian band Piso 21 featuring Colombian singer Manuel Turizo, from their second studio album Ubuntu (2018). It was released on 20 October 2017 by the Mexican division of the Warner Music Group as the album's third single. The song was written by the band, Juan Diego Medina, Julián Turizo, Manuel Turizo, and its producers Mosty and Eq the Equaliser. It became an instant success across Latin America, where it reached the top 10 in many countries and was certified gold in Colombia two weeks after its release.

Music video
The music video for "Déjala Que Vuelva" premiered on 19 October 2017 on Piso 21's YouTube account. Filmed in Medellín, Colombia, it was directed by JP Valencia of 36 Grados, as of February 2021, the song has been viewed over 1.6 billion times.

Track listing

Charts

Year-end charts

Certifications

References

2017 songs
2017 singles
Manuel Turizo songs
Piso 21 songs
Spanish-language songs
Warner Music Mexico singles